Georg Gallus (6 July 1927 – 13 August 2021) was a German politician of the Free Democratic Party (FDP) who served as member of the German Bundestag.

Life 
On 10 September 1970, Gallus entered the Bundestag to replace Ralf Dahrendorf, who had resigned. He was then a member of the Bundestag until 1994. He always entered the Bundestag via the Baden-Württemberg state list. On 16 December 1976, Gallus was appointed Parliamentary State Secretary to the Federal Minister of Food, Agriculture and Forestry in the Federal Government headed by Chancellor Helmut Schmidt. Following the break-up of the social-liberal coalition, he initially resigned from office on 17 September 1982.

Following the election of Helmut Kohl as Federal Chancellor, Gallus was reappointed Parliamentary State Secretary to the Federal Minister of Food, Agriculture and Forestry on 4 October 1982. Gallus then left the government on 21 January 1993 at the same time as the previous Federal Minister Ignaz Kiechle.

Literature

References

1927 births
2021 deaths
Members of the Bundestag for Baden-Württemberg
Members of the Bundestag 1990–1994
Members of the Bundestag 1987–1990
Members of the Bundestag 1983–1987
Members of the Bundestag 1980–1983
Members of the Bundestag 1976–1980
Members of the Bundestag 1972–1976
Members of the Bundestag 1969–1972
Members of the Bundestag for the Free Democratic Party (Germany)
Parliamentary State Secretaries of Germany
People from Göppingen (district)